Heinz Günthardt and Paul McNamee were the defending champions, but McNamee did not participate this year.  Günthardt partnered Balázs Taróczy, losing in the first round.

Kevin Curren and Steve Denton won the title, defeating Sherwood Stewart and Ferdi Taygan 6–7, 6–4, 6–0 in the final.

Seeds

Draw

Finals

Top half

Bottom half

External links
 Draw

Stockholm Open
1981 Grand Prix (tennis)